Stepanovo is a rural locality (a village) in Krasnooktyabrskoye Rural Settlement, Gus-Khrustalny District, Vladimir Oblast, Russia. The population was 12 as of 2010.

Geography 
The village is located on the Shershul River, 21 km north-west from Krasny Oktyabr, 23 km south-east from Gus-Khrustalny.

References 

Rural localities in Gus-Khrustalny District